Guțu is a surname. Notable people with the surname include:

 Ana Guțu (born 1962), Moldovan politician
 Andrei Guțu (born 1980), Moldovan-Romanian weightlifter
 George Guțu (born 1944), Romanian philologist
 Ion Guţu (born 1943), Moldovan politician
 Lidia Guţu (born 1954), Moldovan politician
 Octavian Guțu (born 1982), Moldovan swimmer

See Also 

 Archford Gutu (born 1993), Zimbabwean footballer
 Gutu (senatorial constituency), Senatorial constituency in the Senate of Zimbabwe
 Gutu District, District in Masvingo, Zimbabwe
 Waqo Gutu (1924–2006), Ethiopian rebel and Oromo nationalist

Surnames of Moldovan origin